Grammiphlebia is a genus of snout moths. It was described by George Hampson in 1906 and contains the species Grammiphlebia obliqualis. It is found in eastern Africa.

References

Pyralinae
Monotypic moth genera
Moths of Africa
Pyralidae genera